Kami is a 1982 Malaysian drama film. It is notable as being the only film featuring Sudirman Haji Arshad, a successful Malay singer dubbed the "Singing Lawyer" as he was a law graduate from the University of Malaya in Kuala Lumpur (an academic background almost unheard of among Malay entertainers). The film is written and directed by Patrick Yeoh, who was notable as being the first non-Malay in several decades to direct a Malay film.

The film is unusual for its time, not following the conventional Bollywood influenced formula that typified Malay films of the era.

Plot
The film is about two young runaway teenagers who meet in the city of Kuala Lumpur after leaving their respective homes in different states. Tookoo (Sudirman) the elder of the two, who was first in the city, "adopts" Din (Zulzamri) and as their relationship develops, is both big brother and father to Din. And as the film progresses we see how Tookoo dreams of being a successful pop singer, and how he and Din survive in the city, collecting recyclable items for sale. We are touched by what these two teenagers go through in the concrete jungle of the city as they are bullied by gangs who rob them of their hard-earned money, cheated by dishonest employers who do not pay them and traumatised by over-zealous police who arrest Tookoo by mistake.

Response
The film was panned by a generation of Malay film reviewers accustomed to the typical Malay film format. However, three out of four established film critics in the country voted it the best film of the year in Malaysia in 1983. The film represented Malaysia at two international film festivals. Zulzamri who played the character of Din won the Best Child Actor Award at the Malaysian National Film Festival.

Cast 
 Sudirman Arshad as Tookoo
 Zul Zamanhuri as Din
 Osman Zailani as Tookoo's father
 Ho Kwee Leng as Tookoo's stepmother
 Ibrahim Din as Mamak
 Shariff Babu as Pak Du
 Azmi Mohamad as Abang Husin
 Azizah Muslim
 Norhayati Yaacob
 Param Andhi
 Balakrishnan Andhi
 Ganesh Munusamy

Songs 
 Budak Baru - Sudirman Arshad
 Pelangi Petang - Sudirman Arshad
 Kesepian - Sudirman Arshad

Media release 
Kami was reaired on Radio Televisyen Malaysia (RTM) TV2 on 22 May 2009. It also aired on Astro Citra.

References

External links 
 

1982 films
1982 drama films
Malay-language films
Malaysian drama films